Michelle Jefté Wong (born 31 December 1979), also known as Michelle J. Wong, is a Costa Rican independent activist, photographer, journalist, and writer. Wong is a columnist and international correspondent for Latin America and the world, and a leading emerging photojournalist.

Life 
Wong was born in Heredia, Costa Rica. At the age of 15 he left home and began his world travels. In 2003, he established himself in Santa Barbara, California, where he began his Journalism, International and Global Studies.

Wong has worked as a photographer and journalist around the world. In 2009, he worked as an intern for Steve McCurry in New York City.

His work in photojournalism has been presented in photography exhibitions in the School of International and Public Affairs at Columbia University, Washington DC, California, New York, Costa Rica, and South America.

In 2011, Wong was awarded 2nd place in the Feature/Multiple Picture category of the National Press Photographers Association (NPPA)'s Monthly News Clip Contest, and in 2013 he was recognized during the humanitarian awards at the Muhammad Ali Center.

Sources

External links 
 Official Web

1979 births
Living people
People from Heredia Province
Photojournalists
Costa Rican photographers
Costa Rican journalists
Costa Rican activists